is a city located in Akita Prefecture, Japan. , the city had an estimated population of 29,201,and a population density of 120 persons per km2. and a population density of 25 persons per km².

Geography
Kitaakita is located in the mountains of north-central Akita Prefecture, about 80 kilometers northeast of the prefectural capital of Akita city.  It accounts for about 10% of the total area of Akita Prefecture.The city is bordered by the Ōu Mountains on the east. The main urban area is  centered around the Takanosu Basin in the middle reaches of the Yoneshiro River, and river basins such as the Ani River and the Koani River, which are tributaries of the Yoneshiro River. The Yoneshiro River originates from the Ōu Mountains, which form the border of the city to the east and south. Much of the city is forest and parts of the city are within the borders of the Towada-Hachimantai National Park.  Due to its inland location, the city is noted for its heavy snowfall in winter.

Neighboring municipalities
Akita Prefecture
Akita
Ōdate
Noshiro
Kazuno
Semboku
Kamikoani
Fujisato

Climate
Kitaakita has a humid continental climate (Köppen climate classification Dfa) with large seasonal temperature differences, with warm to hot (and often humid) summers and cold (sometimes severely cold) winters. Precipitation is significant throughout the year, but is heaviest from August to October.

Demographics
Per Japanese census data, the population of Kitaakita has been decreasing rapidly over the past 60 years.

History
The area of present-day Kitaakita was part of ancient Dewa Province. During the Edo period, the area came under the control of the Satake clan, who ruled the northern third of the province from Kubota Domain. After the start of the Meiji period, the area became part of Kitaakita District, Akita Prefecture in 1878 with the establishment of the modern municipalities system.

The city of Kitaakita was established on March 22, 2005, from the merger of the towns of Aikawa, Ani, Moriyoshi and Takanosu (all from Kitaakita District).

Government
Kitaakita has a mayor-council form of government with a directly elected mayor and a unicameral city legislature of 18 members. The city contributes two members to the Akita Prefectural Assembly.  In terms of national politics, the city is part of Akita District 2 of the lower house of the Diet of Japan.

Economy
The economy of Kitaakita is based on agriculture, forestry, manufacturing of clothing and electronic components,  and seasonal tourism.

Education
Akita University – Kitaakita branch campus 
Kitaakita has seven public elementary schools and three public middle schools operated by the city government and one public high school operated by the Akita Prefectural Board of Education. The prefecture also operates one special education school for the handicapped.

Transportation

Airport
Odate-Noshiro Airport

Railway
 East Japan Railway Company -  Ōu Main Line
  -  - 
 Akita Nairiku Jūkan Railway - Akita Nairiku Line
  -  -  -  -  -  -  -  -  - -  -  -  -  -  -  -  -  -

Highway

Local attractions
Yasu Falls – one of the Japan's Top 100 Waterfalls
Isedōtai Site – a Jōmon period archaeological site and National Historic Monument

Sister city relations
  Fengcheng, Liaoning, China, friendship city since September 11, 1997

Noted people from Kitaakita 
Takekaze Akira, sumo wrestler
Tamezō Narita, musician
Daito Takahashi, Olympic ski jumper
Norihito Kobayashi, Olympic ski jumper
Yūsuke Minato, Olympic ski jumper
Fuyuko Suzuki, Olympic Biathlon athlete

References

External links

Official Website 

 
Cities in Akita Prefecture